The Collegiate church of Saint Lawrence is an old Church situated in Birgu in Malta.

History
In the 'Rollo' (inventory) of the benefices of the churches and chapels in Malta and Gozo, held by Bishop de Mello in 1436, a total of 12 established chapels are mentioned, amongst which the Church of San Lorenzo a Mare.

When the Order of Saint John first settled in Malta in 1530, all of their langues were based in Birgu, so the Church of Saint Lawrence was used as the Order's first conventual church in Malta. It served this purpose for 41 years from 1530 to 1571 until the Knights were transferred to the new capital city Valletta. The foundation stone of the present church was laid in May 1681 by Bishop Molina. It was completed in 1696. The church was inaugurated by Bishop Davide Cocco Palmieri on the feast of St Lawrence, August 10, 1697. It was consecrated in 1723. In 1820 Pope Pius VII bestowed the dignity of Collegiate church upon the parish church of St Lawrence.

War period 
On January 16, 1941 the church was bombed by a German air raid. Both the sacristy and the chapter hall were destroyed. They were both re-built in 1949. On March 22 of the same year the chapel of the blessed Sacrament was destroyed and on April 4, 1942 the dome of the church was destroyed. The chapel was re-built in 1951 and the dome was re-built in 1952.

Present day 
The church building is listed on the National Inventory of the Cultural Property of the Maltese Islands.

Works of art 
The church includes many works of art amongst them the main altar piece by Mattia Preti showing the martyrdom of St Lawrence. Other works of art include paintings by Stefano Erardi such as Christ the Saviour and The Dead Christ

See also

Culture of Malta
History of Malta
List of Churches in Malta
Religion in Malta

References 

Birgu LawrenceCollegiate
LawrenceCollegiate
Birgu LawrenceCollegiate
Birgu Lawrence
Birgu LawrenceCollegiate
Birgu LawrenceCollegiate
Birgu LawrenceCollegiate
Birgu LawrenceCollegiate
Roman Catholic churches completed in 1697
17th-century Roman Catholic church buildings in Malta